The Neustadt International Prize for Literature is a biennial award for literature sponsored by the University of Oklahoma and its international literary publication, World Literature Today. It is considered one of the more prestigious international literary prizes, often compared with the Nobel Prize in Literature. The New York Times called the prize “The Oklahoma Nobel” in 1982 and the prize is sometimes referred to as the “American Nobel”. Since it was founded in 1970, some 30 of its laureates, candidates, or jurors have also been awarded Nobel Prizes. Like the Nobel, it is awarded to individuals for their entire body of work, not for a single one.

History
The Neustadt International Prize for Literature was established as the Books Abroad International Prize for Literature in 1969 by Ivar Ivask, editor of Books Abroad. It was subsequently renamed the Books Abroad/Neustadt Prize, and the award assumed its present name in 1976. It is the first international literary award of this scope to originate in the United States and is one of the very few international prizes for which poets, novelists, and playwrights are equally eligible.

Award
The Prize is a silver eagle feather, a certificate, and $50,000 USD. The award was endowed by Walter and Doris Neustadt of Ardmore, Oklahoma to ensure the award in perpetuity.

The charter of the Neustadt Prize stipulates that the award be given in recognition of outstanding achievement in poetry, fiction, or drama and that it be conferred solely on the basis of literary merit. Any living author writing in any language is eligible, provided only that at least a representative portion of his or her work is available in English, the language used during the jury deliberations. The prize may serve to crown a lifetime's achievement or to direct attention to an important body of work that is still developing. The prize is not open to application.

Selection
Candidates are selected by a jury of at least seven members. Selection is not limited by geographic area, language or genre.

The Neustadt International Prize for Literature is the only international literary award of this scope developed in the United States. It is one of few international prizes for which poets, novelists and playwrights alike are equally eligible.

Neustadt Laureates
Source:

NSK Neustadt Prize for Children's Literature

Source:

List of Neustadt Laureates, Finalists and Jurors

See also
List of literary awards

References

External links
Neustadt International Prize for Literature, official website
Neustadt International Prize for Literature winners listed by year (1970 – present)

International literary awards
Awards established in 1969
University of Oklahoma
American fiction awards